Novo Korito is a village in the municipality of Knjaževac, Serbia. According to the 2002 census, the village has a population of 208 people. And according to finding in 2011, 126

References

Populated places in Zaječar District